Gaura Purnima is a Vaishnava festival that celebrates the appearance of the Sri Chaitanya Mahaprabhu (1486–1534), who founded Gaudiya Vaishnavism. It occurs on the Purnima (Full moon day) in the Hindu month Phalguna, usually falling in March or April.

Gaura Purnima means "Golden Full Moon", a reference to Chaitanya. His followers spend this festival fasting and chanting congregationally, then at moonrise a feast is enjoyed by all. It will be celebrated on March 7, 2023. 

This festival is celebrated by Gaudiya Vaishnavas as part of Nabadwip-mandala Parikrama.

See also
Caitanya Mahaprabhu
ISKCON
Gaudiya Vaishnavism
Nabadwip
Festivals of West Bengal

References

External links
Gaura purnima www.mayapur.com
Gaura purnima www.krishna.com

Hindu festivals
Religious festivals in India
Festivals in West Bengal
Public holidays in India
March observances
April observances
Bengali Hindu festivals
Observances held on the full moon